Sir John Brocket (c. 1540 – 2 October 1598) of Brocket Hall in Hertfordshire was an English politician.

Biography
John Brocket was the son of Sir John Brocket (1513–1558) and educated at Trinity College, Cambridge.

He succeeded his father in 1558 and was appointed High Sheriff of Essex and Hertfordshire for 1566–67. He was elected the secondary Member of Parliament for Hertfordshire in 1572. He was knighted in 1577.

The 1578 edition of Calvin's Lectures or Daily Sermons upon the Prophet Jonas, translated into English by Nathaniel Baxter contained a long dedication to him.

Family
Sir John married twice: firstly Helen, the daughter of Sir Robert Lytton of Knebworth, with whom he had 5 daughters and secondly Elizabeth, the daughter and coheiress of Roger Moore, and widow of Gabriel Fowler, with whom he had another daughter. His daughter Frances Brockett married Dudley North, 3rd Baron North in 1599.

He was father-in-law to Sir John Cutts MP).

References

1540s births
1598 deaths
Alumni of Trinity College, Cambridge
English MPs 1572–1583
Members of the Parliament of England for Hertfordshire
High Sheriffs of Essex
High Sheriffs of Hertfordshire
Year of birth uncertain